The 2007 Pickup Truck Racing season was the 11th Pickup Truck Racing season. It was won by Steve Dance with 3 race wins and 12 podiums. Going into the final race, Nic Grindrod was twenty points behind Steve Dance but with a second place for Dance and Grindrod finishing outside of the top ten, Dance secured the championship by 65 points. The Rookie trophy was won by Neil Tressler.

Race Calendar

August 19 second race did not run due to unscheduled track activity extending beyond track curfew.

Final Championship Standings

Rockingham Oval Championship 

Pickup Truck Racing also includes a sub-championship for races held on the Rockingham oval circuit. The championship completed on 16 September as follows:

Pickup Truck Racing (series)